Königsbergbreen is a glacier in Sabine Land at Spitsbergen, Svalbard. It is named after the German town of Königsberg. The glacier has a length of about seven kilometers, and is tributary to Hayesbreen. A nearby mountain is Jebensfjellet.

References

Glaciers of Spitsbergen